John Bolde,  D.D. was  an English Anglican priest in the 16th century.

Bolde was  educated at Corpus Christi College, Oxford. Bolde was Archdeacon of Northumberland from 1578 until his resignation in 1581.

Notes

16th-century English people
Archdeacons of Northumberland
Alumni of Corpus Christi College, Oxford